Rhabdocupes is an extinct genus of beetles in the family Ommatidae, known from the Late Triassic Madygen Formation of Kyrgyzstan, containing the following species:

 Rhabdocupes baculatus Ponomarenko, 1969
 Rhabdocupes longus Ponomarenko, 1966
 Rhabdocupes minor Ponomarenko, 1966

References 

Ommatidae
Carnian genera
Fossils of Kyrgyzstan
Madygen Formation
Prehistoric beetle genera